The Aerodyne Jumbe is a series of French single-place and two-place, paragliders that was designed by Michel Le Blanc and produced by Aerodyne Technologies of Talloires.

Design and development
The Jumbe was designed as an intermediate glider, with the five models each named for their relative size. The Jumbe XL is also known as the Shani and can be used for two-place flight training.

The brake travel on the Jumbe was increased over the Spirit and this also increased performance of the design.

Operational history
In a 2003 report, South African paraglider reviewer Jaco Wolmarans describes flying the Jumbe and how he was impressed enough with the design to become a dealer for the company. He evaluated many gliders in use at the time and rated the Jumbe as the best. "When I arrived in Annecy, the shop had only a small Jumbe available, so I took it anyway and flew from the lower launch at Plan Fait. Since it is usually difficult to get up from here, and me being 5kg over the top, I wasn't expecting much so early in the day. In the light conditions, I was not surprised to find myself low over a hill upwind from the landing with not much height left over, but clinging tenaciously to a thermal. A Sky Bronte flying with me earlier had gone down, and the only other traffic was a super-fast UP Gambit, a guy leading an XC course who saw me circling and who came rushing over. We fought bravely, but, well, he landed before me. He landed and apparently muttered to Nicky, who helped me fold the glider (do this in your best French accent): "Djour friend, he flies well!" Imagine my surprise when on my next flight, I went on a little XC jaunt, and found myself low again, on the same hill, with the same UP for company! Poor guy must have felt rotten after that because I outclimbed him by 300m!"

Jumbes were flown by seven pilots in 15 Paragliding World Cup competition races, between March 2007	and June 2010.

Variants
Jumbe XS
Extra small-sized model for lighter pilots. The glider model is DHV 1-2 and AFNOR St certified.
Jumbe S
Small-sized model for lighter pilots. The glider model is DHV 1-2 and AFNOR St certified.
Jumbe M
Mid-sized model for medium-weight pilots. The glider model is DHV 1-2 and AFNOR St certified.
Jumbe L
Large-sized model for heavier pilots. The glider model is DHV 1-2 and AFNOR St certified.
Jumbe XL/Shani
Extra large-sized model for heavier pilots and for lighter two-seat flights. It is also known as the Shani. The glider model is AFNOR St certified.

Specifications (Jumbe M)

References

Jumbe
Paragliders